Woodway is a city in Snohomish County, Washington, United States. The population was 1,307 at the 2010 census.

Based on per capita income, one of the more reliable measures of affluence, Woodway ranks 6th of 522 areas in the state of Washington to be ranked. It is also the highest rank achieved in Snohomish County.

History

The community was founded in 1914 by attorney turned real estate developer David Whitcomb, who acquired  and began developing "Woodway Park". The city includes areas north and south of the original Woodway Park which offer one third acre lots and  lots in addition to the  lots in the park where the original secluded, wooded environment remains.

Woodway was officially incorporated on February 26, 1958, in an effort to protect the heavily forested area from development and avoid annexation by Edmonds. The city was named for its natural setting by a real estate developer. At that time, Woodway high school students attended the old Edmonds High school until the new Woodway High School was opened in 1970. In 1990, this school merged with Edmonds High School to create Edmonds Woodway High School.

Woodway became a city in 1986 but continues to use the Edmonds post office. Well into the 1980s, the city lacked businesses, sidewalks, and parks; it was almost entirely zoned for single-family homes, which were among the most expensive in Snohomish County. Its first major development since incorporation, the 94-home Woodway Highlands, was approved in 1999 following disputes between residents and the Central Puget Sound Growth Management Hearings Board. Its first homes were completed in 2003. As of 2021, no part of Woodway is zoned for commercial use.

Woodway is the only city in Snohomish County in area code 206, but some areas were switched to area code 425 in 1997.

Geography

Woodway is located at the southwestern edge of Snohomish County, bordered to the north and east by Edmonds and the south by Shoreline in King County. Puget Sound lies to the west of the town, including an unincorporated area known as Point Wells.

Demographics

2010 census
As of the 2010 U.S. census, there were 1,307 people, 448 households, and 373 families living in the city. The racial makeup of the city was 87.5% White, 0.6% African American, 0.8% Native American, 7.8% Asian, 0.6% from other races, and 2.7% from two or more races. Hispanic or Latino of any race were 2.7% of the population.

There were 448 households, of which 41.5% had children under the age of 18 living with them, 75.7% were married couples living together, 4.7% had a female householder with no husband present, 2.9% had a male householder with no wife present, and 16.7% were non-families. 12.9% of all households were made up of individuals, and 6.7% had someone living alone who was 65 years of age or older. The average household size was 2.90 and the average family size was 3.18.

The median age in the city was 45.8 years. 28.3% of residents were under the age of 18; 4.9% were between the ages of 18 and 24; 14.9% were from 25 to 44; 37.5% were from 45 to 64; and 14.4% were 65 years of age or older. The gender makeup of the city was 49.2% male and 50.8% female.

2000 census
As of the 2000 census, there were 936 people, 336 households, and 280 families living in the city. The population density was 840.1 people per square mile (325.6/km2). There were 343 housing units at an average density of 307.9 per square mile (119.3/km2). The racial makeup of the city was 94.12% White, 0.32% Native American, 3.85% Asian, 0.43% from other races, and 1.28% from two or more races. Hispanic or Latino of any race were 0.85% of the population.

There were 336 households, out of which 34.8% had children under the age of 18 living with them, 77.7% were married couples living together, 5.4% had a female householder with no husband present, and 16.4% were non-families. 14.0% of all households were made up of individuals, and 7.7% had someone living alone who was 65 years of age or older. The average household size was 2.76 and the average family size was 3.02.

In the city, the age distribution of the population shows 24.4% under the age of 18, 4.0% from 18 to 24, 17.8% from 25 to 44, 34.1% from 45 to 64, and 19.8% who were 65 years of age or older. The median age was 47 years. For every 100 females, there were 91.8 males. For every 100 females age 18 and over, there were 86.3 males.

The median income for a household in the city was $101,633, and the median income for a family was $109,428. Males had a median income of $86,928 versus $33,333 for females. The per capita income for the city was $51,613. About 0.7% of families and 2.4% of the population were below the poverty line, including 0.9% of those under age 18 and 3.3% of those age 65 or over.

Government and politics

Woodway is an incorporated code city, but its official name remains the Town of Woodway. It has a mayor–council government with six elected officials on four-year terms: the mayor and five town councilmembers.  Woodway's town hall was moved in 2013 to a new building designed by GGLO.

Woodway is the only community in Snohomish County without public library service; residents have repeatedly voted against paying into the Sno-Isle Libraries system, with individuals citing high property taxes as their primary reason for opting out.

Infrastructure

Transportation

Woodway is served by State Route 104, which clips the city's northeast corner and connects it to the Edmonds ferry terminal and Interstate 5 (I-5) in Mountlake Terrace. The BNSF Railway's Scenic Subdivision runs along the city's western coastline and carries Sounder commuter rail service, which stops at Edmonds station. The city is part of the public transportation benefit area for Community Transit, but is not served by its buses; it is, however, part of the dial-a-ride service area for paratransit routes.

Notable residents

 Morris Graves, artist
 Matt Cameron, musician
 Jeannette Wood, state legislator

References

External links
 City website

Cities in Snohomish County, Washington
Cities in the Seattle metropolitan area
Cities in Washington (state)
Populated places on Puget Sound